Svanskog is a locality situated in Säffle Municipality, Värmland County, Sweden with 510 inhabitants in 2010.

References 

Populated places in Säffle Municipality
Värmland